Vertou is a railway station in Vertou, Pays de la Loire, France. The station is located on the Nantes-Saintes railway. Since 15 June 2011 the station is served by a tram-train service between Nantes and Clisson operated by the SNCF. The following services currently call at Vertou:
local service (TER Pays de la Loire) Nantes - Clisson

References

Railway stations in Loire-Atlantique